William Simons was a British actor:

William Simons may also refer to:
 William Simons (politician), Reconstruction era politician in South Carolina
 William Simons (priest), English Anglican priest

See also
 Billy Simons, American singer-songwriter
 William Simon (disambiguation)
 William Simmons (disambiguation)